Roman Paul Alois Koch (born 4 February 1958) is a sailor from Germany, who as helmsman, together with his teammates Maxl Koch and Gregor Bornemann, became twice World Champion in the Soling.

Sailing life 
Koch switched, with his brother Maxl Koch, after a good run in the Flying Dutchman in 1977 to the Soling. Koch as helmsmen won his first Soling World Championship 20–27 May 2005 of the Tyrrhenian sea in front of Castiglione della Pescaia, Italy with Maxl Koch and Gregor Bornemann. The second time took place five years later 5–13 February on the Guaiba river off the coast of Porto Alegre, Brasil. After the Championship in Castellione the Koch team earned the nickname "The Maremma boys". In 2009 the Koch team took the silver at the Soling Worlds in Etobicoke, Canada.
Furthermore, Koch won two gold and five silver medals at Soling European Championships between 2003 and 2013 all as helmsman and with the same team members. Koch holds many national Championships in several countries.

Awards 
 Bearer of the “Golden Badge of Honor” from the Bavarian Sailing Federation 1995, 2005-2011
 Bearer of the “Letter of Honor” from the City of Starnberg 2008-2011
 Bearer of the “Deed of Honor” from the City of Berlin 2006, 2008-2010
 “Sailor of the Year 2010” in the Yacht-Club-Berlin-Grünau 
 Honorary member of the CVCP, Castiglione della Pescaia

Personal life 
Koch lives in Munich and works in the marine industry as sailmaking consultant, sailing coach and consultant for tracking and trace.

References

1958 births
Living people
German male sailors (sport)
Flying Dutchman class sailors
Dragon class sailors
Sportspeople from Munich
Soling class world champions
European Champions Soling